Yixing is a county-level city administrated under the prefecture-level city of Wuxi in southern Jiangsu province, China, and is part of the Yangtze River Delta. The city is known for its traditional Yixing clay ware tea pots. It is a pene-exclave with Changzhou.

History

During the Xia dynasty and Shang dynasty, the area fell under the jurisdiction of Yangzhou and was known as Jingxi. The area was subsequently known as Jingyi during the Zhou dynasty.

The area was first organized as a county in 221 BCE, during the Qin dynasty, under the name of Yangxian County. Between 303 and 310 CE, local general , the eldest son of General Zhou Chu, suppressed three rebellions. Yangxian County was then renamed Yixing Commandery, in honor of Zhou Qi. Yixing Commandery remained under the jurisdiction of Yangzhou. In 589 CE, under the Sui dynasty, Yixing was re-designated from a commandery back to a county, and was placed under the jurisdiction of Changzhou.

In 976 CE, Yixing County was renamed to the similar sounding Yixing County, because of the naming taboo of Emperor Taizong of Song, who went by the personal name of Zhao Guangyi. The renaming perhaps to be the allusion of a sentence in Doctrine of the Mean: "Righteousness is the accordance of actions". During this time, Yixing County remained under the jurisdiction of Changzhou.

In 1725, under the Qing dynasty, the area was split into two counties: Yixing County, and Jingxi County.

In 1912, the Republican government abolished Jingxi County and merged it back into Yixing County.

People's Republic of China 
Following this, Yixing fell under the jurisdiction of  until March 1983. Beginning in March 1983, Yixing County was placed under the jurisdiction of the prefecture-level city of Wuxi, which it remains part of today. In January 1988, Yixing County was abolished, and Yixing was reorganized as a county-level city, which it remains today.

Geography 

Yixing's area spans from 31°07′ to 31°37′ north, and from 119°31′ to 120°03′ east. The city is located in the far south of Jiangsu province, lying in between the cities of Shanghai, Nanjing, and Hangzhou. The city is border to the east by Lake Tai, by Changxing County in neighboring Zhejiang province to the southeast, the county-level city of Guangde in neighboring Anhui province to the southwest, the county-level city of Liyang in Changzhou to the west, Jintan District in Changzhou to the northwest, and Wujin District in Changzhou to the north. To its north, situated between Yixing and Wujin District, lies Ge Lake.

Yixing's terrain is higher in the south, and lower in the north.

Environment 
In 2020, the city's government recorded an average PM2.5 level of 30.4 micrograms per cubic meter, an 18.9% improvement from 2019. 82.5% of days in Yixing during 2020 had good air quality, as judged per the government.

Climate

Administrative divisions
Yixing is divided into 5 subdistricts, 14 towns, and 2 other township-level divisions. These township-level divisions are then further divided into 102 residential communities and 207 administrative villages.

Subdistricts
Yixing administers the following 5 subdistricts:
 


 
 

Towns
Yixing administers the following 14 towns:
 Dapu
 
 
 
 Gaocheng
 
 

 
 Xinjian
 
 
 
 Zhoutie

Other township-level divisions 
Yixing administers the following 2 other township-level divisions:
 Huanke Park
 Yixing Economic Development Zone

Demographics 

As of 2020, the city government estimates Yixing's registered hukou population to be 1,075,800 people. Of this, 529,300 residents are male, and 546,500 are female. The city saw 7,038 births in 2020, giving it a birth rate of 6.53‰ (per thousand), and 9,694 deaths, giving it a death rate of 8.99‰. This gave Yixing a rate of natural increase of -2.46‰ in 2020.

The city is home to 42 different ethnic minorities, who comprise a population of about 15,000 (1.39% of Yixing's total population).

Economy

As of 2020, Yixing has a gross domestic product (GDP) of 183.221 billion renminbi (RMB). This represented a 3% increase from the previous year. The city's per capita disposable income stands as 50,987 RMB, a 5.1% increase from the previous year. This figure stands at 61,090 RMB for urban residents, and 32,430 RMB for rural residents, reflecting a 4.4% and 6.6% increase from the previous year, respectively.

Transportation 

Yixing railway station is located on the Nanjing–Hangzhou high-speed railway, while the latter two are part of the Xinyi–Changxing railway.

In 2020, the Changyi Expressway, a section of the  linking Yixing to Jiangdu District in Yangzhou, was completed. The same year, the Yichang Expressway, a section of the  linking Yixing to Changxing County and Hangzhou in neighboring Zhejiang province, was also completed.

Tourist attractions
Dongcang Bridge is a historic stone arch bridge in the city.

Notable people
Ding Junhui, professional snooker player
Jiang Fengzhi, musician erhu artist
Xu Beihong, painter
the ancestral home of Chiang Kai-shek

References

External links
 Yixing Municipal Government website (In Simplified Chinese characters)

 
Cities in Jiangsu
County-level divisions of Jiangsu
Wuxi